The Ukrainian Air Assault Forces (or ), known until 2017 as the Ukrainian Airmobile Forces, are the airborne forces of Ukraine. They formed in 1992 and were part of the Ukrainian Ground Forces until 2016, when they separated to become one of five branches of the Armed Forces of Ukraine. The Air Assault Forces are in constant combat readiness and are the high-mobility branch of the military, responsible for air assaults and military parachuting operations. Before the Russo-Ukrainian War they were also the main forces sent by Ukraine to peacekeeping missions around the world. They are considered the elite of Ukraine's armed forces.

History 

The Ukrainian Air Assault Forces were created in 1992 from units of the Soviet Airborne Forces (VDV) stationed on Ukrainian territory after the dissolution of the Soviet Union on 25 December 1991. In the 15 years after their creation, Ukrainian paratroopers have served in peacekeeping missions to the Balkans, in Iraq, Kuwait, Lebanon, Sierra Leone, Liberia, Ethiopia, Georgia and DR Congo. In 2007, the 13th Separate Airmobile Battalion served as part of Polish–Ukrainian Peace Force Battalion, a peacekeeping unit with Kosovo Force.

War in Donbas and beyond 
In August 2014 the 95th Air Assault Brigade conducted a raid behind the separatist lines. The 95th Brigade, which had been reinforced with armor assets and attachments, launched a surprise attack on separatist lines, broke through into their rear areas, fought for 450 kilometers, and destroyed or captured numerous Russian tanks and artillery pieces before returning to Ukrainian lines  and established a corridor in which the Ukrainian army units and civilians trapped at the border could retreat. It was one of the longest armored raids in military history.

In 2016, the Ukrainian Airmobile Forces became an independent branch of the Armed Forces. Previously, they were part of Ground Forces.

On 21 November 2017 (Ukraine's Paratroopers' Day) President Petro Poroshenko stated that 469 Ukrainian paratroopers had been killed in the (ongoing) Russo-Ukrainian War. On 21 November 2018 he adjusted this to 487 killed.

2017 reforms 
Air Assault Forces Day was celebrated on 2 August in Ukraine, as it was in the Soviet Union, until 2017, when it changed to 21 November 2017. President Poroshenko said "It is logical to celebrate your professional holiday on November 21. The usual August 2 is the date of the first jump of paratroopers in the Moscow Military District. How is it about us? Moscow is not Kyiv. Ukraine is not Russia." He added that "The start of the new Paratroop Day is part of the Ukrainianization of the historical and political calendar – the replacement of the Soviet-Russian imposed upon us."

On 21 November 2017 the Air Assault Forces received its new insignia – the dome of a parachute "as a symbol of airborne units around the world" and the wings of Archangel Michael and "the flaming sword with which he hits the enemies". The color of the Ukrainian paratroopers was changed to maroon, and from 2017 the UkrAAF wear the maroon berets common to many Western airborne units.

Russian full invasion 

Beginning Thursday, 24 February 2022, the day the Russian Armed Forces begun its invasion of the republic, the UkrAAF have been participants of some of the land combat actions of the current conflict, fighting alongside their Ground Forces, Territorial Defense and National Guard brethren in arms.

Structure 

In 2014, the staffing of an airmobile brigade was brought up to 1,200 personnel. Each brigade was given at least one artillery battalion from the 25th and 55th artillery brigades and a tank battalion. Currently, the total staffing of the brigades ranges from 1,000 to 2,200 personnel, depending on the deployment. Most of the brigades operate in 1-2 battalion tactical groups, in each of which, in addition to infantry battalions, there are up to two artillery battalions and at least one tank company equipped with BTRs and BMPs.

2001 

In 2001 the Airmobile Force consisted of:

2022

Air Assault Forces Command, Zhytomyr 

  Air Assault Forces Command, N/A
  135th Management Battalion, Zhytomyr
  199th Training and Education Center, Zhytomyr

Combat units 

  25th Airborne Brigade, Hvardiiske
  45th Air Assault Brigade, Bolhrad
  46th Airmobile Brigade, Poltava
   71st Jaeger Brigade, N/A
  77th Airmobile Brigade, Zhytomyr
  79th Air Assault Brigade, Mykolaiv
  80th Air Assault Brigade, Lviv
  81st Airmobile Brigade, Kramatorsk
 82nd Air Assault Brigade, N/A (new raising)
  95th Air Assault Brigade, Zhytomyr
  132nd Intelligence Battalion, Ozerne
  148th Field Artillery Battalion (Airborne), Zhytomyr

Rear elements 

 N/A 102nd Material Storage Unit, Zhytomyr
 124th Topographic Unit, Zhytomyr
 N/A  232nd Combined Supply Unit, N/A
  347th Communication Unit, Zhytomyr

Commanders

Armament

Personal firearms 
 PM, semi-automatic pistol (9×18mm)
 
 AKS-74, para assault rifle (AK-74 with folding skeleton buttstock) (5.45×39mm)
 AKS-74U, short-barreled para assault rifle carbine with folding skeleton buttstock(5.45×39mm)
 AKMS, para assault rifle with a downward-folding metal stock similar to that of the German MP40 (7.62×39mm)
   – AK-74 modernization
 Fort-221 – TAR-21 licensed copy
 RPKS-74, the light weight para machinegun (5.45×39mm)
 PKM, general purpose machine gun (7.62×54mmR)
 Dragunov SVDS sniper rifle (7.62×54mmR)
 GP-25 and GP-30, the under-barrel 40 mm grenade launchers for fragmentation and gas grenades which are attached to AKS-74 of some paratroopers to increase firepower for combating enemy foot troops
 AGS-17 "Plamya" (Flame), automatic grenade launcher – may be replaced in the future by a much lighter UAG-40.

Armored vehicles 
T-80 - principal main battle tank
Challenger 2 main battle tank
BMD-1
BMD-2
BMD-3
BTR-D
BTR-80
BTR-70
BTR-3
BTR-4
MT-LB
GT-MU
KrAZ "Spartan"
HMMWV M1114 UAH
AT105 Saxon
Dozor-B
Véhicule de l'Avant Blindé
Bushmaster Protected Mobility Vehicle

Artillery 
 2S9 "Nona-S" configuration of 2S9 Nona, 120 mm self-propelled mortar
2S23 Nona-SVK
2S1 Gvozdika
2S3 Akatsiya
BM-21 Grad
 ZU-23-2, an aged but effective and powerful design of a double barrel 23 mm anti-aircraft gun, commonly used against infantry and even APCs and IFVs, it is either mounted on any amphibious hulls, usually based on PT-76 light tank, or can be towed by jeep or truck as it has wheels.

Vehicles 
KrAZ-6322
GAZ-66
Joint Light Tactical Vehicle

Gallery

See also 
 Special forces of Ukraine
 Russian Airborne Forces

References

External links 

 Official site 
 Ministry of Defence
 Military Forum 

Military units and formations of Ukraine
Airmobile units and formations